is a passenger railway station located in the city of Yoshinogawa, Tokushima Prefecture, Japan. It is operated by JR Shikoku and has the station number "B13".

Lines
Only local trains stop at the station.

Layout
The station consists of two opposed side platforms serving 2 tracks. The station building is unstaffed and serves only as a waiting room. Access to the opposite platform is by means of a footbridge. A siding branches off track 1 and ends near the station building.

Platforms

Adjacent stations

History
When the company was nationalized on 1 September 1907, Japanese Government Railways (JGR) took over control of the station and operated it as part of the Tokushima Line (later the Tokushima Main Line). On 25 March 1914, the name of the station was changed to Yamase. With the privatization of Japanese National Railways (JNR), the successor of JGR, on 1 April 1987, the station came under the control of JR Shikoku. On 1 June 1988, the line was renamed the Tokushima Line.

Passenger statistics
In fiscal 2014, the station was used by an average of 128 passengers daily.

Surrounding area
The area around the station is the center of former Yamase Town
Japan National Route 192
Yoshinogawa City Yamase Elementary School

See also
 List of Railway Stations in Japan

References

External links

 JR Shikoku timetable

Railway stations in Tokushima Prefecture
Railway stations in Japan opened in 1899
Yoshinogawa, Tokushima